The Thumb is a region and a peninsula of the U.S. state of Michigan, so named because the Lower Peninsula is shaped like a mitten. The Thumb area is generally considered to be in the Central Michigan region, east of the Tri-Cities and north of Metro Detroit. The region is also branded as the Blue Water Area.

The counties that constitute the Thumb form the peninsula that stretches northward into Lake Huron and Saginaw Bay. There is no formal list of which counties are part of the Thumb, but virtually all definitions include Huron, Tuscola, and Sanilac Counties, and most include Lapeer and St. Clair Counties.

Economy

The Thumb region is very flat with fertile soil, the reason for its historical role as a chiefly agricultural area. Major agricultural products include sugar beets, navy beans, corn, fruits, and fish from the Saginaw Bay and Lake Huron. Manufacturing—particularly concerning the automotive industry—is also prevalent in Michigan's Thumb due to the region's proximity to the automotive centers of Detroit and Flint.

Industry

The Thumb has many notable businesses, many linked to agriculture.
Intertape Polymer Group, Inc. has a major factory in Marysville.
Cargill Salt operates a large salt mine and factory in St. Clair. This is the only plant in the U.S.A. that produces Alberger salt, which is especially prized in the fast food industry because of its higher volume (due to its unique shape) and lower sodium content (for a given volume, not weight). This is part of Michigan's large salt-mining industry.
Cooperative Elevator Company has been named the top Michigan Agriculture Exporter by the Michigan Department of Agriculture. Its headquarters are in Pigeon, and it has branch elevators in Deckerville, Akron, Gagetown, Sebewaing, Elkton, and Bad Axe.
Detroit Edison is the operator of three power plants in the Thumb area: St. Clair and Belle River Power Plants in East China Township, and Greenwood Energy Center in Greenwood Township.
Dow AgroSciences Harbor Beach manufactures agricultural chemicals: weed killer, fungicides, fertilizers and plant nutrients and herbicides.
Mueller Industries owns and operates Mueller Brass in Port Huron.
Grand Trunk Western Railway has a major rail yard in Port Huron Township.
Marysville Hydrocarbons is an ethanol plant in Marysville.
SMR Automotive manufactures rear view mirrors at facilities in Port Huron and Marysville. 
Port Huron-based P.J. Wallbank Spring manufactures components for transmissions.
Port Huron's industrial park is home to many companies that produce plastic components for vehicles, such as Prism Plastics, Huron Plastics Group, and International Automotive Components.
Michigan Ethanol, a partner of Broin Companies, operates a corn ethanol production facility in southwest Caro.
Michigan Sugar Company, an agricultural cooperative owned by 1200 farmers, operates four plants in the area. It is the successor to the 100-year-old "Big Chief" and "Pioneer" Sugar companies. Local plants are located in Caro, Sebewaing, Croswell, and headquarters in Bay City.
Domtar operates a paper mill in Port Huron. The plant will close in 2021. 
Dunn Paper  is located at the mouth of the St. Clair River just north of the Blue Water Bridge and produces specialty papers.
Keihin Michigan Manufacturing operates an auto part manufacturing plant in Capac, they build HVAC and intake manifold assemblies that are used in Honda vehicles. The plant is scheduled to close in 2021.
Champion manufactures small and mid size buses at their facility in Lapeer County's Imlay Township.
Sensient Technologies Corporation, Harbor Beach, makes food flavors and colors, yeast dehydrated products and vegetable protein extract.
Star of the West Milling Co. which has grain elevators in Vassar and Cass City, joined with Eastern Michigan Grain in Emmett.
Huron Castings produces shell molded steel castings in Pigeon, Michigan.
Pigeon Telephone Co. has been meeting telecommunications needs of the rural communities it serves since 1908.
Agri-Valley Services, more commonly known as AVCI, is an internet service provider based out of Pigeon, Michigan.
Thumb Cellular has been providing rural cellular service to the thumb area since 1991.

International Trade Corridor
The I-69 International Trade Corridor is a strategic commercial gateway between the Midwestern United States and Ontario, Canada, with multi-modal transportation infrastructure that offers a wide range of distribution options. The I-69 International Trade Corridor Next Michigan Development Corporation (NMDC) offers economic incentives to growing businesses, both existing and new, that utilize two or more forms of transportation to move their products and are located within the territory of the NMDC. The I-69 International Trade Corridor Next Michigan Development Corporation is the largest in the state of Michigan with 35 municipal partners.

Constituent counties of the trade corridor are: Shiawassee, Genesee, Lapeer, and St. Clair Counties.

Tourism

Some towns, such as Bay Port, Caseville, Harbor Beach, Lakeport, Lexington, Port Austin, Port Hope, Port Huron, Port Sanilac, Sebewaing, and St. Clair enjoy seasonal tourism, due to their locations on Lake Huron, Saginaw Bay, or St. Clair River. Tourism and farming drive the local economy.

The Tip of The Thumb Heritage Water Trail is a nonprofit citizens organization working with the Huron County Parks to establish and maintain a water trail along Michigan's Lake Huron's shoreline.

Unique to the Thumb
Many of the residents commute for work to Metro Detroit, Flint or the Tri-Cities. Incorporated cities with 2,000+ population in the Thumb area are Port Huron, Marysville, Lapeer, St. Clair, Marine City, Algonac, Caro, Imlay City, Bad Axe, Vassar, Sandusky and Croswell. The majority of these cities are in the southern portion of the Thumb.

Unique features in the area include the following:
Algonac, known as the Venice of Michigan because of its many canals.
Bad Axe was named after a broken axe found lodged in the knot of a tree at the clearing of the settlement's chief crossroads.
Bay Port, is the world's largest freshwater fishing port.
Harbor Beach is the home of the largest man-made harbor and the Harbor Beach Light.
Harvest Wind Farm, an electrical generation project of Exelon Wind and Wolverine Power Supply Cooperative. Harvest II is scheduled for completion in December 2012.
 Huron County Nature Center includes a  wilderness arboretum that has been under the care of the Huron County Women's Clubs for more than 50 years.
On the western coast of Whiskey Harbor, this area is a great place to see migratory birds in early March and November.
Kinde was once the bean capital of the world.  Michigan Bean soup has been a staple for over a hundred years in the U.S. Senate dining room (Senate bean soup).
Pigeon is the home of the Cooperative Elevator Company, one of the largest grain elevators in the state.
Port Huron is the maritime capital of the Great Lakes, where Lake Huron flows into the St. Clair River. This is the largest city in the Thumb area. It was the boyhood home of Thomas Edison.
The Sanilac Petroglyphs were discovered after massive fires swept the Lower Peninsula in 1881. Native Americans created this unusual artwork 300 to 1,000 years ago. The petroglyphs provide a glimpse into the lives of an ancient woodland people who occupied Michigan's Thumb area.
Sebewaing is the sugar beet capital of the world, and home to one of the four Michigan Sugar Company factories in the Thumb region. The sugar companies were organized with money from lumber barons such as Rasmus Hanson.
St. Clair boasts the world's largest boardwalk along freshwater, the St. Clair River.
Turnip Rock, an unusual undercut sea stack at the extreme northern tip of the Thumb.
Michigan Underwater Preserves are protected areas of the Great Lakes on Michigan's coast.
Caseville is the home of the annual Cheeseburger in Caseville festival, a hometown festival devoted to Jimmy Buffett's song "Cheeseburger in Paradise".

Traveling around the Thumb
A favorite of tourists who visit this area is traveling the Lake Huron and Saginaw Bay shoreline via M-25 (formerly US Highway 25 until 1973). M-25 starts at the end of I-69/I-94 in Port Huron at the foot of the Blue Water Bridge and ends in Bay City. Located along Lake Huron through which M-25 passes are five lighthouses: Fort Gratiot Lighthouse, Port Sanilac lighthouse, Pointe aux Barques Lighthouse, Harbor Beach Light, and the Port Austin Lighthouse.

The Great Lakes Circle Tour is a designated scenic road system connecting all of the Great Lakes and the St. Lawrence River. Many visitors choose to begin the circle tour in Port Huron, from which they can circle Lake Huron. M-25 winds around the Thumb and along the Saginaw Bay to Saginaw and Bay City. Lexington and Port Austin feature beaches and boardwalks that are favorites with visitors.

Lighthouse Tour

In order from east to west:
Huron Lightship — Lake Huron / St. Clair River — Port Huron
Fort Gratiot Light—Lake Huron / St. Clair River—Port Huron
Port Sanilac Light—Lake Huron— Port Sanilac—Private
White Rock Memorial Light—Lake Huron — White Rock—Private
Harbor Beach Light—Lake Huron — Harbor Beach
Pointe aux Barques Light—Lake Huron—near Port Hope
Port Austin Light—Lake Huron — Port Austin
Charity Island Light — Saginaw Bay
Saginaw River Light — Saginaw River

Area festivals and events

Antique and Yard Sale Trail 2nd weekend in August, (Algonac to Sebewaing)
Art on the River, third week in June, St. Clair.
Art on the Avenue, downtown Port Huron, 3rd week in August.
 around the state.
Bay Port Fish Sandwich Festival (Bay Port)
Blue Water Ramble (St. Clair) Annual International Bicycling Event along the St. Clair River in Michigan and Ontario, Canada, involving two ferry boat crossings, first weekend in October.
Boat Night & Port Huron to Mackinac Boat Race (Port Huron to Mackinac Island)
Cheeseburger in Caseville Festival (Caseville)
Croswell Agricultural Society Fair (Croswell) celebrating its 125th year in 2009
Croswell Swinging Bridge Festival (Croswell)
Feast of the Sainte Claire sponsored by the Port Huron Museum of Arts and History, a large living reenactment of 18th century life—Memorial Day weekend, (Port Huron).
Harbor Beach Maritime Festival(Harbor Beach)
Huron County Fair (Bad Axe)
Michigan Bean Festival Labor Day weekend (Fairgrove)
Farmer's Festival (Pigeon)
Michigan Sugar Festival (Sebewaing)
"Port Huron Float Down"  Third Sunday in August (Port Huron)
"The Original" Country Christmas Lighted Farm Implement Parade (Sandusky)
Tuscola County Pumpkin Festival (Caro)
Sanilac County 4-H Fair (Sandusky)
St. Clair County 4-H Fair (Goodells County Park)
Thumbfest (Lexington)
Yale Bologna Festival (Yale)

Thumb counties

Huron
Huron County is located at the tip of the thumb.
The county's economy relies on agriculture and ranks as one of the top agricultural counties in Michigan. Rich farmland inland produces beans, sugar beets and grain, including most of the world's supply of navy beans. Tourism is also important to Huron County with bay front and lakefront towns such as Sebewaing, Caseville, Port Austin, Port Hope, and Harbor Beach, attracting tourists from all over. Huron County borders the Saginaw Bay and Lake Huron. There are two state parks – Sleeper State Park and Port Crescent State Park. Three roadside parks – Jenks Park, Brown Park, and White Rock Park. Also, Huron County maintains nine county parks along the shoreline, which are Caseville Park, Lighthouse Park, Stafford Park, McGraw Park, Philp Park, Port Austin Bird Creek Park, Wagener Park, Oak Beach Park, and Sebewaing Park.
The county seat is Bad Axe, located in the center of the county.

Lapeer
The origin of the name of the county is often disputed, but it may have derived from the French words la pierre, meaning "the stone". This name could be a reference to the rounded stones, or flint pebbles, found in the rivers and streams throughout the area. Another theory is that it may be an English variation of Le Pays Plat, meaning "the flat land", which is one of the original names given to the area by the French, and can be found on many early fur trader maps of the area. The idea is that "Le Pays" may have evolved into the current pronunciation, "Lapeer".

Lapeer County is in many ways different from the other counties of the Thumb. First, it is heavily influenced by its proximity to Flint and Detroit, so as a result, its economy depends more heavily on manufacturing than the other counties of the region. Second, although agriculture is still a key economic factor in Lapeer County, it is not as important to the economy as in the other counties. Although there are still a few large-scale farms located in the county, the numbers are not found to the same extent, and these days, most farming in Lapeer now takes place on smaller, independent farms, which usually supply the local markets only. Lastly, in addition to its economic and agricultural differences, Lapeer County's geography is very different from the other counties of the Thumb. Its topography is generally gently rolling to quite hilly, and unlike its neighbors, which are flatter, and border on Lake Huron or Lake St. Clair, Lapeer County is landlocked. The county still has hundreds of acres of inland lakes such as Barnes Lake, Miller Lake, Lake Neppessing, the Holloway Reservoir, Big Fish Lake, and Lake Metamora, and several state recreation areas, including the Ortonville Recreation Area and the Metamora-Hadley Recreation Area, which still bring in many campers and tourists.

Sanilac
The County of Sanilac has the largest area of land in The Thumb. Like other counties, Sanilac has fertile and flat land, great for growing crops. Towns like Lexington and Port Sanilac bring in many tourists from the Detroit Area. Sandusky is the county seat and largest city.

St. Clair
St. Clair County has the largest population in The Thumb, and is considered part of the Metro Detroit MSA. Many residents farther north in The Thumb, especially Sanilac County, travel to Port Huron for shopping and work. It is the farthest county to the east in Michigan, and most of the eastern border is the St. Clair River, which separates Michigan from Ontario. For the most part, St. Clair County is flat with an agricultural economy dominating in the north and west; in the 19th century, agriculture and lumbering were important east to the St. Clair River. Sugar beets were cultivated and annual festivals were held at harvest time. In addition, many farms had mixed agriculture. There are steep hills and small canyons near the Black River. Since the mid-20th century, manufacturing had dominated in and around Port Huron.

Tuscola
Like Huron County, Tuscola is mostly dependent on agriculture. Industries such as sugar refining and ethanol processing, as well as growing various grains and beans, make up most of the economy. Caro, one of the largest cities in The Thumb (the largest if you exclude St. Clair and Lapeer Counties), is named after Cairo, Egypt and is the county seat. Tuscola County only has  of shoreline along Saginaw Bay, so it is not as dependent on tourism as the other counties in the area. Tuscola County is economically tied to the surrounding region as well as to the Saginaw, Bay City, and Flint areas.

Borderline regions
The boundaries of what is included in the Thumb are often debated, but nearly all definitions include Huron, Sanilac, and Tuscola counties, known as the tri-county region. Disputed areas include:
St. Clair County, especially the southern portion, as the county is now classified as part of Metro Detroit by the Census Bureau.
Lapeer County
Richmond and northern Macomb County.
Genesee County

Blue Water Area

The Blue Water Area is another term describing the Thumb of Michigan. The term usually applies to St. Clair County and surrounding areas. The title is also extended to include all of Michigan's Thumb. The name refers to the county being bordered by water: on the east is the St. Clair River, connecting Lake Huron to the north to Lake St. Clair. Below that is the Detroit River. The namesake Blue Water Bridge spans the St. Clair river, connecting Port Huron to Sarnia, Ontario. A similar name, "Blue Water Country," is used to describe the same region on the Canadian side.

Discover the Blue
Discover the Blue is a promotion by the Blue Water Area Convention and Visitor's Bureau. It is designed to attract visitors to the shoreline of eastern Michigan. Communities participating in Discover the Blue include Algonac in St. Clair County (at the southern end of the Thumb) and others to the north, such as Port Austin (at the tip of the Thumb).

Geography

Land features
See also List of Michigan state parks and geography of Michigan.
The Thumb's landscape ranges from a flat sandy plain along the shores of Lake Huron and Saginaw Bay, to a gently rolling topography. This land is fertile and well suited for agriculture. The most unusual geographic formation is a rugged glacial moraine, known collectively as the Hadley Hills, which extends in a northeasterly direction through the center of The Thumb, from the southwestern portion of the peninsula.
All counties except for Lapeer border the Saginaw Bay or Lake Huron.
Huron County is very flat. It has large fields that were used for agriculture and now are the sites of numerous wind turbines to generate electricity. 
The "tip of the Thumb" is Pointe Aux Barques, between Port Austin and Grindstone City.
Marlette is called the "heart of the Thumb," because of its central position on the peninsula.

Major rivers
The Thumb has many waterways.
The Pinnebog, Shebahyonk, and Pigeon rivers all rise in the center of Huron County and empty into the Saginaw Bay.
St. Clair River, connects Lake Huron to Lake St. Clair, and is the farthest east border in Michigan. It forms a low impression in eastern St. Clair County, and has a delta at its mouth (North America's largest freshwater delta), which includes Harsens Island and Walpole Island, Ontario. Ferries cross the river at Algonac and Marine City, these being international border crossings.
Black River rises near Minden City and flows into the St. Clair River at Port Huron. The Black River forms a basin in Sanilac County, and northern St. Clair County.
The north branch of the Flint River lies in northern Lapeer County. It rises near North Branch. The southern branch flows through the central and southern portion of Lapeer County, originates in Brandon, Atlas, Hadley, and Metamora townships before merging with the North Branch just north of the Holloway Reservoir.

History and local culture

Culture
Since the late 18th century, ethnic European Americans have displaced the Native American tribes that historically occupied this territory.  Since the early 20th century, they have dominated the population and culture of The Thumb. The French were the first Europeans to arrive, and thus influenced much of the early culture. They were mostly engaged in the fur trading and lumber industries, and had relatively few settlers. After the British won the French and Indian War, they took over this former French territory.

Many of these new settlers were sent into the area by the British from Canada in an effort to establish their dominance over the Great Lakes. In 1783, control of The Thumb was officially transferred to the newly formed United States, after the American Revolution and by the Treaty of Paris. The British were a dominant influence until after the War of 1812, when the northern border was firmly defined and this area came under US control.  The US organized the Northwest Territory, and American settlement of Michigan and The Thumb was well underway by the mid-19th century. Construction of the Erie Canal through Central New York created stronger connections with the port of New York and eastern markets. Settlers migrated west from New York and New England into Ohio and Michigan, seeking new territory.

As a result of this history, the land was settled primarily by people of ethnic English and Scots-Irish descent; many arrived from Canada. Other settlers of the same ancestry migrated from eastern states such as New York, and Pennsylvania, as well as from New England. Immigration from the British Isles took place through the century, and later 19th and 20th century residents included Polish and German immigrants who migrated from Europe through the Detroit area. Many of the customs, much of the regional lifestyle, and even the local accent, strongly reflect these origins. Some local radio stations have featured polka shows, and various ethnic festivals, such as the Polkafest, in Kinde, are representative of Eastern European cultures.

In the early years, Europeans encountered and traded with people of the Fox and Sauk tribes, already living in the area for centuries. There may have also been other tribes in the area such as the Potawatomi, Ojibwe, and Kickapoo, but they would have been transient tribes, or found in very small numbers. All native Thumb area tribes are members of the Algonquian peoples, a large language family. Other tribes who migrated later into the area included the Wyandot (Huron), an Iroquoian language-speaking people; and the Ottawa. The displacement of native peoples took place in many areas during the settling of North America.

Historical events
The Port Huron area is one of oldest European settlements in the state of Michigan, first settled by French colonists.
Colonial-era forts such as Fort Gratiot (north of Port Huron) and Fort Sinclair (near present-day St. Clair) were built along the St. Clair River.
Bad Axe was named so because Captain Rudolph Papst found an old axe in 1861, when he was clearing land for the present-day Huron County seat.
The great Thumb Fire took place on September 5, 1881, in the Thumb area of Michigan. The fire, which burned over a million acres (4,000 km2) in less than a day, was the consequence of drought, hurricane-force winds, heat, the after-effects of the Port Huron Fire of 1871, and the ecological damage wrought by the era's logging techniques of clear cutting forests.
The Great Lakes Storm of 1913 was a November blizzard with hurricane-force winds; it devastated the Great Lakes Basin in the United States Midwest and the Canadian province of Ontario. The storm also battered and overturned large ships on four of the five Great Lakes, particularly Lake Huron.

Notable people (by town)
More comprehensive lists are available at individual cities, villages, etc. See local towns of interest at the bottom of the page for links.

Brown City
Robert Teet – Wrestler, author

Cass City
 Brewster H. Shaw – retired United States Air Force colonel and former NASA astronaut.

Deckerville
Gabriel Rheaume – Writer – The Shores We Walk

Harbor Beach
 Frank Murphy – Detroit mayor, Michigan governor, U.S. Attorney General and Justice of the United States Supreme Court.

Lapeer
 Marguerite de Angeli, children's book author, Newbery Award winner
 Danelle Gay, Miss Michigan USA 2006
 Terry Knight, singer, DJ, manager, Terry Knight and the Pack, Grand Funk Railroad
 Jake Long, offensive lineman, Miami Dolphins
 Terry Nichols, accomplice in the Oklahoma City bombing
 Jim Slater, hockey player Atlanta Thrashers

Port Huron
 Thomas Edison – Inventor and entrepreneur settled in Port Huron from 1854 to 1863.
 Obadiah Gardner – born in Port Huron, he moved to Maine as a child, where he lived and worked for the rest of his life, being elected as US Senator from Maine
 Terry McMillan – Award-winning author of novels Waiting to Exhale, and How Stella Got Her Groove Back

Local elected officials

Local politicians in Washington and Lansing are listed below.

United States Congress
District 9 – Northern Macomb, and all of St Clair, Lapeer, Sanilac, Huron, and Tuscola counties.
Lisa McClain, Republican
District 8 – Saginaw/Bay City Area, and all of Genesee County.
Dan Kildee, Democrat

Michigan House
32nd District – Northern Macomb and six townships in St Clair County.
Pamela Hornberger, Republican
81st District – Most of St Clair County, except Port Huron.
Gary Eisen, Republican
82nd District – All of Lapeer County.
Gary Howell, Republican
83rd District – City of Port Huron, the Townships of Fort Gratiot and Burtchville, and all of Sanilac County.
Andrew Beeler, Republican
84th District – All of Huron and Tuscola Counties.
Phil Green, Republican

Michigan Senate
25th District – All of Huron, St Clair and Sanilac Counties, and the Cities of Memphis, New Baltimore, and Richmond and the Townships of Armada and Richmond in Macomb County.
Dan Lauwers, Republican
31st District – All of Bay, Lapeer and Tuscola Counties.
Kevin Daley, Republican

Colleges and universities
St. Clair County Community College, with the main campus in Port Huron, and learning centers in Huron, Sanilac, and Lapeer Counties.
Baker College, with a campus in Cass City, Sandusky, and Port Huron.
University of Michigan–Flint, Saginaw Valley State University, and Delta College, while not in the Thumb, are universities and colleges that attract many residents from the Thumb.

Museums

Harbor Beach
 Frank Murphy Memorial Museum and home.
 Grice House Museum – Harbor Beach

Marysville
 Marysville Historical Museum – Marysville
 Wills Ste. Claire Auto Museum – Marysville

Port Huron

 Port Huron Museum – a series of five museums – Port Huron
 Carnegie Center – Port Huron
 Huron Lightship – Port Huron
 Thomas Edison Depot Museum – Port Huron
 USCGC Bramble (WLB-392) – Port Huron
 Fort Gratiot Lighthouse – Port Huron

Elsewhere in the Thumb
 Sanilac County Historical Museum – Port Sanilac
 Bad Axe Historical Society Museum – Bad Axe
 Capac Historical Museum – Capac
 Pointe aux Barques Lighthouse near Port Hope
 St. Clair County Farm Museum – Goodells
 Port Austin History Center - Port Austin

Media

Radio
The Thumb Area Radio Region is an unranked market that is influenced by Detroit Radio Market, the Tri-Cities Radio Market and the Flint Market, with stations in Port Huron and Sarnia, Ontario also serving the region.

 Local Radio Stations in the Thumb Area

Newspapers
 The Huron Daily Tribune is a daily newspaper serving the "Upper Thumb Area of Michigan", which includes all of Huron and portions of Tuscola counties.
 The Times Herald is a daily newspaper headquartered in Port Huron and distributed in St. Clair and Sanilac counties. It is owned by the Gannett Company.
 Daily editions of the Detroit Free Press and The Detroit News are available throughout the area.
 The Bay City Times and Saginaw News are available in northern and western portions of the area, while the Flint Journal is available in Lapeer County.

 Huron County newspapers

Harbor Beach Times
Huron County Press
Huron Daily Tribune
The News Weekly
The Lakeshore Guardian
Thumb Blanket

 Lapeer County newspapers

Buyer's Guide
The County Press
LA View
Webco Press

 Sanilac County newspapers

Brown City Banner
Buyers Guide
Camden Publications
Deckerville Recorder
Marlette Leader
Sandusky Tribune
Sanilac County News

 St. Clair County newspapers

Blue Water Shopper
Port Huron Times Herald
The Thumb Print News
The Voice
The Yale Expositor

 Tuscola County Newspapers

Tuscola County Advertiser
Cass City Chronicle
Cass River Trader
Reese Reporter
Vassar Pioneer Times
Mayville Monitor

Broadcast television
The Lapeer County, St. Clair County and Sanilac County area lies in the Detroit Television Market. The far northern and western areas lie inside the Flint/Tri-Cities Television Market. The only broadcast TV station licensed to the Thumb region is WDCQ-TV, the PBS station licensed to Bad Axe.

 Flint/Tri-Cities

WSMH, Fox 66
WEYI-TV, NBC / CW 25
WJRT-TV, ABC 12
WNEM-TV, CBS / MyTV 5
WDCQ-TV, PBS 19

 Sarnia/Windsor Ontario

CBET-DT, CBC 9
CIII-DT, Global 22/29
CICO-DT, TVO 32/59
CKCO-TV, CTV 42

 Detroit area

WJBK, Fox 2
WDIV-TV, NBC 4
WXYZ-TV, ABC 7
WWJ-TV, CBS 62
WTVS, PBS 56
WKBD, CW50
WMYD, MyTV 20
WADL, independent 38

 Alpena area

WBKB-TV, CBS / ABC / Fox / MyTV 11

Transportation

Borders
The border between Port Huron, Michigan and Sarnia, Ontario is one of the busiest connections between Canada and the US. Crossings include the two Blue Water Bridges and the two St. Clair River Railway Tunnels. Ferries also connect to Canada at Marine City and Algonac.

Major highways
(organized by numbers)

 begins at the Blue Water Bridge, proceeds west through Flint, then Lansing, and then turns south to Angola, Indiana.
 has its eastern terminus at the U.S. side of the Blue Water Bridge in Port Huron, Michigan, at the Sarnia, Ontario, Canada border, where together with I-69 it meets Ontario Highway 402.

 is a highway of an arc-like shape closely following the outline of the Thumb along the Lake Huron/Saginaw Bay shoreline between Port Huron and Bay City. It is generally a scenic drive.

 is a cross peninsular road, running across the mitten and the Thumb—from Port Sanilac on the Lake Huron shore; through Saginaw near Saginaw Bay; and then on to Muskegon on the Lake Michigan shore. This east-west surface route nearly bisects the Lower Peninsula of Michigan latitudinally.
 is a gateway route to The Thumb of Michigan, carrying vacationers to the resorts and cottages on Saginaw Bay and Lake Huron in the vicinity of Caseville and Port Austin. It goes up the middle of the Thumb, and directly connects in Macomb County, Michigan to the M-53 expressway. It is an important route for agricultural and manufactured goods.

Rail

Area Amtrak stations are in Lapeer, Port Huron, and Flint. Local railroads are the Grand Trunk Western Railroad, CSX Transportation, Canadian National Railway, and the Huron and Eastern Railway. Pere Marquette Railway was a railroad that had lines throughout the Thumb; its lines are now either abandoned or in use by CSX, or Huron and Eastern.

Major railroad centers are Vassar, Bad Axe and Port Huron.

Airports
The only international airport in the Thumb is St. Clair County International Airport about  outside Port Huron. City airports include: Caro Municipal, Dupont-Lapeer Airport, Huron County Memorial Airport, Marine City Airport, Marlette Municipal, Sandusky City, and Yale Airport. Scheduled airline service is available from MBS International Airport in Freeland, Michigan and Flint Bishop International Airport. While neither of these airports is in the Thumb, both are relatively close by.

Area codes
Area code 989 covers about half of the Thumb: Huron, Tuscola, and far northern Sanilac County (and the Marlette, Michigan area). The Thumb's other half is covered by area code 810, which takes in most of Sanilac, Lapeer, Genesee and Saint Clair Counties. All of Macomb County is served by area code 586, as is a small part of south-western Saint Clair County.

See also

State
 Michigan

Regional
Flint/Tri-Cities and Tri-Cities
Lake Huron
Metro Detroit

Counties
List of counties in Michigan

Cities and villages

Akron (Tuscola)
Algonac (St. Clair)
Applegate (Sanilac)
Almont (Lapeer)
Armada (Macomb)
Bad Axe (Huron)
Brown City (Sanilac/Lapeer)
Capac (St. Clair)
Caro (Tuscola)
Carsonville (Sanilac)
Caseville (Huron)
Cass City (Tuscola)
Clifford (Lapeer)
Columbiaville (Lapeer)
Croswell (Sanilac)
Deckerville (Sanilac)
Dryden (Lapeer)
Elkton (Huron)
Emmett (St. Clair)
Fairgrove (Tuscola)
Forestville (Sanilac)
Gagetown (Tuscola)
Harbor Beach (Huron)
Imlay City (Lapeer)
Kinde (Huron)
Kingston (Tuscola)
Lapeer (Lapeer)
Lexington (Sanilac)
Marine City (St. Clair)
Marlette (Sanilac)
Marysville (St. Clair)
Mayville (Tuscola)
Melvin (Sanilac)
Memphis (St. Clair/Macomb)
Metamora (Lapeer)
Millington (Tuscola)
Minden City (Sanilac)
North Branch (Lapeer)
Otter Lake (Lapeer/Genesee)
Owendale (Huron)
Peck (Sanilac)
Pigeon (Huron)
Port Austin (Huron)
Port Hope (Huron)
Port Huron (St. Clair)
Port Sanilac (Sanilac)
Reese (Tuscola/Saginaw)
Richmond (Macomb/St. Clair)
Romeo (Macomb)
Sandusky (Sanilac)
Sebewaing (Huron)
St. Clair (St. Clair)
Ubly (Huron)
Unionville (Tuscola)
Vassar (Tuscola)
Yale (St. Clair)

Notes

Further reading
Ackerman, Emma J. Thumb Fires of 1871 and 1881. CMU Term Paper, 1968.
DuMond, Neva. Thumb diggings; adventures into Michigan's Thumb area. Lexington, Mich, 1962.
The Great Fire of 1881: A Collection of Stories. Caro, MI: Tuscola County Advertiser, 1981.
Hatt, R. T. — The petroglyphs, by D. J. Richards. — An archeological survey of the petroglyph site, by M. Papworth (republished from the Michigan archeologist, Dec. 1957) The Sanilac petroglyphs. Bloomfield Hills, Michigan: Cranbrook Institute of Science, 1958
House Party: Reminiscences by Traditional Musicians and Square Dance Callers in Michigan's Thumb Area. Port Huron, MI: Museum of Arts and History, 1982.
Schultz, Gerard. A History of Michigan's Thumb.
Smith, Dee. Treks into the Past: Historical Sketches of Michigan's Thumb. Decatur, MI: Heritage Valley Publishing, 1989.
Southgate, Jerry D. Thumb's Forest Fire of 1881. Central Michigan University Term Paper, 1967.

External links

 Great Lakes Coast Watch
 Seeing the Light: Terry Pepper on lighthouses of the Western Great Lakes.

Peninsulas of Michigan
Central Michigan
Lake Huron
Regions of Michigan
Huron County, Michigan
Lapeer County, Michigan
Port Huron, Michigan
Sanilac County, Michigan
St. Clair County, Michigan
Tuscola County, Michigan